Arthrostylidium reflexum is a species of Arthrostylidium bamboo in the grass family.

Distribution 
The species is native to South America and the Caribbean.

Description
Its width is typically straight, bilateral, and reaches 0.5 cm long. It has 3 Lodicules, 3 Anthers and 2 Stigmas.

References 

reflexum